"Old Thing Back" is a 2015 single by Norwegian DJ Matoma that is a club remix of the 2007 song "Want That Old Thing Back" by The Notorious B.I.G. featuring Ja Rule and Ralph Tresvant. "Want That Old Thing Back" appeared on the compilation album Greatest Hits, and is a remix of the 1995 Notorious B.I.G. single "One More Chance". "Old Thing Back" is credited to "Matoma and The Notorious B.I.G. featuring Ja Rule & Ralph Tresvant", making this Matoma's debut single as a main artist.

Both "Want That Old Thing Back" and "Old Thing Back" were produced after The Notorious B.I.G.'s death in 1997.

Rise to popularity and release
The remix initially became popular in the summer of 2014 when it reached #1 on the music aggregator website Hype Machine. Many record companies expressed interest in Matoma's work after hearing the remix. Ja Rule, who is featured on the original track, wrote on Twitter that he loved the track.

The track was officially released in March 2015, on Big Beat Records. It charted on VG-lista, the official Norwegian singles chart and Sverigetopplistan, the official Swedish singles chart.

An instrumental version of the remix is featured in the 2014 snowboarding film Shredbots The Movie directed by Leo Cittadella.

Charts

Weekly charts

Year-end charts

Certifications

References

 

2014 songs
2015 debut singles
Matoma songs
The Notorious B.I.G. songs
Ja Rule songs
Ralph Tresvant songs
Big Beat Records (American record label) singles
Songs written by the Notorious B.I.G.
Songs written by Ja Rule
Songs written by Jack Knight (songwriter)
Songs written by Matoma
Tropical house songs
Warner Music Group singles